The Sea Road to Rothesay is a passenger and vehicle ferry service across the Firth of Clyde in western Scotland. It links Wemyss Bay on the mainland with Rothesay, Bute.

History
Following the opening of the Wemyss Bay pier and railway station in 1865, the steamer service between Wemyss Bay and Rothesay became one of the most important routes on the Firth of Clyde. Today it is one of the busiest crossing operated by Caledonian MacBrayne with about 725,000 passengers and 200,000 vehicles being carried each year.

References

Caledonian MacBrayne